"Alcohaulin' Ass" is a song by American heavy metal band Hellyeah and the second single from their album of the same name. The name is a combination of the word alcohol and the phrase "haulin' ass". As the song opens, Chad Gray sings in a country-type croon, and acoustic guitars are heard in the background with typical Western-sounding effects. The song picks up into a grooving hard rock format, where it continues for the rest of the track. The bonus edition of the album Hellyeah includes a solely acoustic version of "Alcohaulin' Ass".

Chart performance

The song reached number 7 on the Mainstream Rock Tracks chart.

References

2007 singles
Hellyeah songs
2007 songs
Epic Records singles
Songs written by Vinnie Paul
Songs written by Chad Gray
Songs written by Greg Tribbett
Songs written by Tom Maxwell